The men's masters competition at the 2002 Asian Games in Busan was held on 8 and 9 October 2002 at the Homeplus Asiad Bowling Alley.

The Masters event comprises the top 16 bowlers (maximum two per country) from the all-events category.

Schedule
All times are Korea Standard Time (UTC+09:00)

Results

Preliminary

Stepladder finals

References 

2002 Asian Games Official Report, Pages 316–317
Results at ABF Website
Results

External links
Official Website

Men's masters